The timeline of major famines in India during British rule covers major famines on the Indian subcontinent from 1765 to 1947. The famines included here occurred both in the princely states (regions administered by Indian rulers), British India (regions administered either by the British East India Company from 1765 to 1857; or by the British Crown, in the British Raj, from 1858 to 1947) and Indian territories independent of British rule such as the Maratha Empire.

The year 1765 is chosen as the start year because that year the British East India Company, after its victory in the Battle of Buxar, was granted the Diwani (rights to land revenue) in the region of Bengal (although it would not directly administer Bengal until 1784 when it was granted the Nizamat, or control of law and order.)  The year 1947 is the year in which the British Raj was dissolved and the new successor states of Dominion of India and Dominion of Pakistan were established.  The eastern half of the Dominion of Pakistan would become the People's Republic of Bangladesh in 1971.

A "major famine" is defined according to a magnitude scale, which is an end-to-end assessment based on total excess death.  According to it: (a) a minor famine is accompanied by less than 999 excess deaths); (b) a moderate famine by between 1,000 and 9,999 excess deaths; (c) a major famine by between 10,000 to 99,999 excess deaths; (d) a great famine by between 100,000 to 999,999 excess deaths; and (e) a catastrophic famine by more than 1 million excess deaths.

The British era is significant because during this period a very large number of famines struck India.  There is a vast literature on the famines in colonial British India. The mortality in these famines was excessively high and in some may have been increased by British policies. The mortality in the Great Bengal famine of 1770 was between one and 10 million; the Chalisa famine of 1783–1784, 11 million; Doji bara famine of 1791–1792, 11 million; and Agra famine of 1837–1838, 800,000.  In the second half of the 19th-century large-scale excess mortality was caused by: Upper Doab famine of 1860–1861, 2 million; Great Famine of 1876–1878, 5.5 million;  Indian famine of 1896–1897, 5 million; and  Indian famine of 1899–1900, 1 million.  In the first third of the 20th-century, benefitting from earlier work on analysis and prevention of famines by the British authories, the scale and frequency of the famines decreased, although some severe crop failures and famines did occur. However, the Bengal famine of 1943,  which affected the Bengal region during wartime, was one of the major South Asian famines in which anywhere between 1.5 million and 3 million people died.

The era is significant also because it is the first period for which there is systematic documentation.  Major reports, such as the Report on the Upper Doab famine of 1860–1861 by Richard Baird Smith, those of the Indian Famine Commissions of 1880, 1897, and  1901 and the Famine Inquiry Commission of 1944, appeared during this period, as did the Indian Famine Codes.  These last, consolidating in the 1880s,  were the first carefully considered system for the prediction of famine and the pre-emptive mitigation of its impact; the codes were to affect famine relief well into the 1970s. The Bengal famine of 1943, the last major famine of British India occurred in part because the authorities failed to take notice of the famine codes in wartime conditions.  The indignation caused by this famine accelerated the decolonization of British India.  It also impelled Indian nationalists to make food security an important post-independence goal. After independence, the Dominion of India and thereafter the Republic of India inherited these codes, which were modernized and improved, and although there were severe food shortages in India after independence, and malnutrition continues to the present day, there were neither serious famines, nor clear and undisputed or large-scale ones.  The economist Amartya Sen who won the 1998 Nobel Memorial Prize in Economic Sciences in part for his work on the economic mechanisms underlying famines, has stated in his 2009 book, The Idea of Justice:Though Indian democracy has many imperfections, nevertheless the political incentives generated by it have been adequate to eliminate major famines right from the time of independence. The last substantial famine in India — the Bengal famine — occurred only four years before the Empire ended. The prevalence of famines, which had been a persistent feature of the long history of the British Indian Empire, ended abruptly with the establishment of a democracy after independence.

Migration of indentured labourers from India to the British tropical colonies of Mauritius, Fiji, Trinidad and Tobago, Surinam, Natal and British Guyana has been correlated to a large number of these famines. The first famine of the British period, the Great Bengal famine of 1770, appears in work of the Bengali language novelist Bankim Chandra Chatterjee; the last famine of the British period, Bengal famine of 1943 appears in the work of the Indian film director, Satyajit Ray. The inadequate official response to the Great Famine of 1876–1878, led Allan Octavian Hume and William Wedderburn in 1883 to found the Indian National Congress, the first nationalist movement in the British Empire in Asia and Africa. Upon assumption of its leadership by Mahatma Gandhi in 1920, Congress was to secure India both independence and reconciliation.

Timeline

Gallery

See also
 Famine in India (British rule)
 Company rule in India
 Drought in India
 Famine in India
 List of famines

Notes

Citations

References

History

Famines

Epidemics and Public Health
 
 
 
 
 
 
 

Famines in British India
Famines in India
famines
famines
famines